The Women's long distance events in cross-country skiing, 15 km classical for category standing and visually impaired and 10 km classical for sitting, were held on April 4 and 5 as part of the 2011 IPC Biathlon and Cross-Country Skiing World Championships.

Medals

Results

Sitting
April 5

Standing
April 4

Visually impaired
April 4

References

2011 IPC Biathlon and Cross-Country Skiing World Championships Live results, and schedule at ipclive.siwidata.com
WCH - Khanty Mansiysk - Results - Cross-Country Long Distance, IPC Nordic Skiing
WCH - Khanty Mansiysk - Results - Cross-Country Long Distance - Sitting, IPC Nordic Skiing

20 kilometre classical